The Windsor Half Marathon is a race that takes place every September at Windsor Great Park, and is run over a distance of .

Course
First Stage
 Double Gates (start)
 Copper Horse (1 Mile)
 Royal Lodge / First Aid / Drinks Station (2 Miles)
 Royal School (3 Miles)
 First Aid / Drinks Station (4.5 Miles)
 Copper Horse (5 Miles)
 Bishops Gate (6 Miles)

Second Stage
 Cumberland Gate (7 Miles)
 First Aid / Drinks Station (9 Miles)
 Sandpit Gate (10.5 Miles)
 First Aid / Drinks Station (11 Miles)
 Copper Horse (12 Miles)
 Double Gates (Finish / )

Recent Winners 
Table of recent winners.

References

External links
 Official website

Half marathons in the United Kingdom
Athletics competitions in England
Windsor Great Park
Sport in Berkshire